Victor Williams (born 1970) is an American actor.

Victor Williams may also refer to:
Victor Williams (general) (1867–1949), Canadian general and Commissioner of the Ontario Provincial Police
Victor Williams, American football player for the 2012 Milwaukee Mustangs season
Victor Williams, American arena football player for the 2010 Cleveland Gladiators season
Victor Williams, percussionist on The Heart of Things: Live in Paris
Vic Williams, American politician from Arizona